WNT1-inducible-signaling pathway protein 1 (WISP-1), also known as  CCN4, is a matricellular protein that in humans is encoded by the WISP1 gene.

Structure 

WISP-1 is highly homologous to CYR61 (CCN1) and CTGF (CCN2), and is a member of the CCN family of secreted, extracellular matrix (ECM)-associated signaling proteins (CCN intercellular signaling protein). The CCN family of proteins shares a common molecular protein structure, characterized by an N-terminal secretory signal peptide followed by four distinct domains with homologies to insulin-like growth factor binding protein (IGFBP), von Willebrand type C repeats (vWC), thrombospondin type 1 repeat (TSR), and a cysteine knot motif within the C-terminal (CT) domain. This family of proteins regulates diverse cellular functions, including cell adhesion, migration, proliferation, differentiation, and survival.

Role in bone development 

WISP-1 promotes mesenchymal cell proliferation and osteoblastic differentiation, and represses chondrocytic differentiation. WISP-1 binds BMP2 and enhances BMP2 function in osteogenesis. These activities may be modulated by its direct binding to decorin and biglycan, two members of a family of small leucine-rich proteoglycans present in the extracellular matrix of connective tissue.

Clinical significance 

WISP-1 attenuates p53-mediated apoptosis in response to DNA damage through activation of the Akt kinase, and inhibits TNF-induced cell death in cardiomyocytes. Recombinant WISP-1 enhances ECM deposition in human fibroblasts, suggesting that it might play a role in matrix remodeling in vivo. WISP-1 is upregulated in human patients with idiopathic pulmonary fibrosis and in a mouse model of bleomycin-induced lung fibrosis. Orotracheal application of WISP-1 neutralizing antibodies to the lung ameliorates bleomycin-induced lung fibrosis, raising the possibility that WISP-1 might be a potential target for anti-fibrotic therapy.

Expression of WISP-1 promotes tumor growth, and high WISP-1 expression correlates with advanced tumors of the brain, breast, colon, and lung. WISP-1 appears to inhibit metastasis although expression of a WISP-1 splicing variant lacking the VWC domain appears to enhance the invasive characteristic of gastric carcinoma cells.

References 

CCN proteins